International Steel Company was a steel company in Evansville, Indiana that created the Landing Ship, Tank (LST) warships for World War II. The current remaining division of International Steel Co. is called International Revolving Door in Evansville, Indiana.

It was founded in 1961.

References

External links
 International Steel Revolving Door

American companies established in 1961
Steel companies of the United States
Companies based in Evansville, Indiana
Defunct companies based in Indiana